Alex Murley (born 20 June 1999) is an English motorcycle racer. He formerly competed in the Superbike World Championship.

Murley is the 2014 and 2015 Kawasaki Junior Cup champion.

Career statistics

European Junior Cup

Races by year 

(key) (Races in bold indicate pole position; races in italics indicate fastest lap)

Supersport 300 World Championship

Races by year
(key)

Supersport World Championship

Races by year
(key) (Races in bold indicate pole position; races in italics indicate fastest lap)

References 

1999 births
Living people
Sportspeople from Solihull
English motorcycle racers